Francis Forbes (1784–1841) was a Chief Justice of the Supreme Court of Newfoundland and New South Wales.

Francis Forbes may also refer to:

Francis Forbes, Lord Mayor of London, 1725
Francis Blackwell Forbes (1839–1908), China merchant, opium trader and botanist
Francis Gordon Forbes (1857–1941), Canadian lawyer, judge and political figure
Francis Murray Forbes, founder of Cabot, Cabot & Forbes